Bhatan is a village located in Raigad district, Konkan division, in the state of Maharashtra, India. It is 9 km from the Mumbai–Pune Expressway, 10 km away from sub-district headquarter Panvel and 60 km away from district headquarter Alibag. As per 2009 stats, it is a Gram panchayat.

Demographics 
 India Census, the population is 1452 people (761 were males and 691 were females) with Sex ratio of 1.1.

Landmarks 

 There is a tunnel through this village, namely Bhatan Tunnel, which is the longest tunnel on Mumbai-Pune Expressway. It connects Mumbai and Pune with two connections; The Mumbai-Pune (North) tube and The Pune-Mumbai (South) tube, of lengths 1,053 m and 1,088 m.
 Amity University, Mumbai is also located within the jungles of  this village.

References 

Villages in Raigad district
Gram Panchayats in Maharashtra